Voron is a Russian language surname from the Russian word for raven. Notable people with the name include:
 Maurice Voron (1928–2004),  French rugby league footballer
 Viacheslav Voron (1967), Russian songwriter

References 

Russian-language surnames
Surnames from nicknames